State Route 118 (SR 118) is 14.81 mile long north–south state highway in Weakley County, Tennessee. It connects the town of Dresden with the communities of Latham, Dukedom, and the state of Kentucky.

Route description

SR 118 begins in downtown Dresden at an intersection with SR 54/SR 89 (Main Street), directly beside the Weakley County Courthouse. It goes north as N Wilson Street past homes and businesses before leaving Dresden and continuing north through a mix of farmland and wooded areas. The highway then passes through Latham, where it has an intersection and short concurrency with SR 190 and crosses the North Fork of the Obion River. SR 118 continues north through farmland to enter Dukedom, where it comes to an end at an intersection with Kentucky Route 129 (KY 129) at the Kentucky state line. The entire route of SR 118 is a two-lane highway.

Major intersections

References

118
Transportation in Weakley County, Tennessee